Gilbert de Clare may refer to:

 Gilbert Fitz Richard known also as Gilbert de Clare (died 1117), lord of Clare, Tonbridge and Ceredigion
 Gilbert de Clare, 1st Earl of Pembroke (1100–1148)
 Gilbert de Clare, 1st Earl of Hertford (1115–1153)
 Gilbert de Clare, 4th Earl of Hertford and 5th Earl of Gloucester (1180–1230)
 Gilbert de Clare, 6th Earl of Hertford and 7th Earl of Gloucester (1243–1295)
 Gilbert de Clare, 7th Earl of Hertford and 8th Earl of Gloucester (1291–1314)